Musica Alta Ripa is a musical ensemble from Hanover, specializing in Baroque music on period instruments.

Background
Founded in 1984, the Hanover-based Musica Alta Ripa is well known for its historically-informed musical performances. The ensemble has won four ECHO Klassik prizes, the Cannes Classical Awards, as well as the 2002 Musikpreis Niedersachsen. A particular focus for the group is the work of Georg Philipp Telemann, whose chamber music they have recorded several discs of. The group is also well known for their efforts to strengthen ties between Syrian refugees and locals.

The ensemble's name comes from the city in which they are based, Hanover.  means in Latin "high riverbank." Similarly, hanover comes from Old German , also meaning "high riverbank."

Members
The ensemble consists of five members:
 Danya Segal — recorder
 Anne Röhrig, Ulla Bundies — violins
 Albert Brüggen — cello
 Bernward Lohr — harpsichord

Selected Discography
Musica Alta Ripa has recorded exclusively with the MDG label.
 Johann Sebastian Bach: Complete concerti
 Johann Sebastian Bach: Complete flute sonatas
 Johann Sebastian Bach: Complete violin sonatas
 Johann Gottlieb Goldberg: Chamber music
 George Frederick Handel: Cantatas and sonatas
 Alessandro Scarlatti: Cantatas
 Georg Philipp Telemann: Concerti and chamber music
 Antonio Vivaldi: Concerti and chamber music

References

Musical groups from Hanover
Musical groups established in 1984
Instrumental early music groups
Historically informed performance